Andrei Aleksandrovich Mironov (March 7, 1941 – August 16, 1987) was a Soviet and Russian stage and film actor who played lead roles in some of the most popular Soviet films, such as The Diamond Arm, Beware of the Car and Twelve Chairs. Mironov was also a popular singer.

Early life
Mironov was born in Moscow to Maria Mironova, a Russian, and Aleksandr Menaker, a Russian Jew. Both his parents were also actors.

Career

Mironov studied in the Vakhtangov Theatre School during the early 1950s. From 1958 to 1962, he studied acting at the Moscow Shchukin School. From June 18, 1962, to 1987, Mironov was a permanent member of the trope at the Moscow Theatre of Satire. In 1961, he acted in his first film What If This Is Love? On December 18, 1980, he was awarded the title of People's Artist of the RSFSR. He also received the Medal "For Labour Valour".

Andrei Mironov is known and loved for his roles in films made by Eldar Ryazanov, Leonid Gaidai, Mark Zakharov, and other directors. He had a wide comedic range and played diverse roles (e.g. a Soviet bureaucrat, Figaro, a romantic spy, a member of the intelligentsia, a con man, an American movie pioneer, a tale-teller, etc.).

On one of his tours through Latvia in 1987, he lost consciousness on stage while performing the lead role in The Marriage of Figaro. Thinking he was having a heart attack, the other actors hastily administered oral nitroglycerin, a drug commonly given to heart attack patients, but which can cause life threatening complications when mistakenly given to those suffering from cerebrovascular disease. He was driven to a hospital where two days later he was pronounced dead. His death occurred only eleven days after the passing of his close friend and frequent co-star Anatoli Papanov. The cause of his death was excessive internal brain bleeding due to a congenital cerebral aneurysm following many years of heavy smoking.

Personal life
Mironov's parents, Aleksandr Menaker and Maria Vladimirovna Mironova, were known nationwide as a comedic duo. He was married twice. First to Yekaterina Gradova, with whom he had one daughter, Maria Mironova, and second to Larisa Golubkina, a singer and actress best known for her role of the hussar maiden in Hussar Ballad. Maria Mironova and his adopted daughter Maria Golubkina (from his marriage with Larisa) had successful careers in Russian cinema.

He had survived a stroke in 1981 and a bout of meningitis that left him in pain and with blisters on his abdomen for the rest of his life, but fought through it and continued acting until his death.

Legacy
A minor planet 3624 Mironov, discovered by Soviet astronomers Lyudmila Karachkina and Lyudmila Zhuravleva in 1982 is named after him.

Partial filmography

What If This Is Love? (1962) as Pyotr
My Younger Brother (1962) as Yura Popov
Three Plus Two (Три плюс два, 1962) as Roman
Two Sundays (1963) as Journalist (uncredited)
A year like a life (1966) as Friedrich Engels
Beware of the Car (Берегись автомобиля, 1966) as Dima Semitsvetov
The Mysterious Wall (1967) as Valya
The Literature Lesson (1968)
To Love (1968, TV Movie) as Anton
The Diamond Arm (Бриллиантовая рука, 1968) as Gennadiy Kozodoyev
Lyubit... (1969)
Family Happiness (1970) as Fyodor Sigaev
Umeyete li vy zhit? (1970) as Attendant (uncredited)
Dve ulybki (1970)
Derzhis za oblaka (1971) as Tukman tábornok
The Shadow (1971) as Caesar Borgia, journalist, man eater
The Kid and Carlson, who lives on the roof (1971, TV Movie) as Rulle
Property of the Republic (Достояние республики, 1972) as Shilovsky aka Marquis
Grandads-Robbers (Старики-разбойники, 1972) as Yury Proskudin
Unbelievable Adventures of Italians in Russia (Невероятные приключения итальянцев в России, 1974) as Andrei Vasiliev
Starye steny (1974) as Arkadiy Nikolayevich
Mad Day or the Marriage of Figaro (1974, TV Movie) as Figaro
The Straw Hat (Соломенная шляпка, 1974, TV Mini-Series) as Leonidas Fadinar
Small comedies of the big house (1974, TV Movie) as Husband (segment 2)
Lev Gurych Sinichkin (1974, TV Movie)
Repeated Wedding (1975, TV Movie) as Boris Andreyevich Vyazovnin
Pages of the Pechorin's diary (1975, TV Movie)
Step forward (1976) as Markel
Povtornaya svadba (1976) as Ilya Fyodorovich
Blue Puppy (Голубой щенок, 1976, Short) as Black Cat (voice)
Heavenly Swallows (1976) as Célestin / Floridor
The Twelve Chairs (12 стульев, 1976, TV Mini-Series) as Ostap Bender
An Ordinary Miracle (Обыкновенное чудо, 1978, TV Movie) as Minister Administrator
Three Men in a Boat (1979, TV Movie) as Jerome K. Jerome
Rikki-Tikki-Tavi (1979) (voice)
Appointment (1980, TV Series)
Say a Word for the Poor Hussar (О бедном гусаре замолвите слово…, 1980) as Narrator (voice)
Krakh operatsii Terror (1981)
Be my husband (Будьте моим мужем, 1982) as Victor
Faratyev's Fantasies (1982, TV Movie) as Faryatyev
Revisor (Inspector) (1982, TV Movie) as Khlestakov
The Story of Voyages (Сказка странствий, 1982) as Orlando
Somewhere in Provincial Garden (1983, TV Movie)
The Blonde Around the Corner (Блондинка за углом, 1984) as Nikolay Gavrilovich Poryvaev
Victory (1984)
My Friend Ivan Lapshin (Мой друг Иван Лапшин, 1984) as Khanin
Pobeda (1985) as Charles Bright
A Man from the Boulevard des Capucines (Человек с бульвара Капуцинов, 1987) as Johnny First
The Pathfinder (1987) as Sanglis

References

External links
The Official web site of Andrei Mironov 
Andrei Mironov 

Andrei Mironov on YouTube
Peter Rollberg, Historical Dictionary of Russian and Soviet Cinema. 2008, ; pp. 456–457

1941 births
1987 deaths
20th-century Russian male singers
20th-century Russian male actors
20th-century Russian singers
Male actors from Moscow
Singers from Moscow
Honored Artists of the RSFSR
People's Artists of the RSFSR
Jewish Russian actors
Russian people of Jewish descent
Russian male film actors
Russian male stage actors
Russian male voice actors
Russian television presenters
Soviet male film actors
Soviet male singers
Soviet male stage actors
Soviet male voice actors
Soviet television presenters
Neurological disease deaths in the Soviet Union
Deaths from intracranial aneurysm
Burials at Vagankovo Cemetery